North Shore Congregation Israel is a Reform synagogue located at 1185 Sheridan Road in Glencoe, Illinois.

The congregation started in 1920 as the North Shore branch of Sinai Congregation, and is the oldest Reform Synagogue in the Chicago North Shore suburbs.  The decision to establish a separate congregation had been a subject of concerned discussion for a number of years, and was perceived as an important step in the evolution of the Jewish presence in the North Shore as a separate community. The first full-time rabbi was Harvey Wessel in 1926.

The congregation's 1964 building is located on a 19-acre lakefront parcel, formerly the location of a 1911 mansion that was designed by Chicago architect David Adler for his uncle, hat manufacturer Charles A. Stonehill, and was later owned by Syma Cohen Busiel, the co-founder of Lady Esther cosmetics, before it was sold to the congregation in 1961 for $500,000.  The building was designed by the well-known, Detroit-based modernist architect Minoru Yamasaki.  Yamasaki composed the building as a series of arching fan vaults.  The voids between the concrete shells of the fan vaults are filled with colored glass above and clear glass at eye level.  Yamasaki describes his design as "a confluence of daylight and solids."   The building has been described as representative of "a period of post-war modernism that was characterized by assertive architectural gestures that had the strength and integrity to stand alone, without applied artwork or Jewish iconography."  Architecture critic Samuel D. Gruber chose an image of the interior of Yamasaki's sanctuary for the cover of his book American Synagogues: A Century of Architecture and Jewish Community, and has noted that this "dramatic, awe-inspiring space" was "hard to use by a congregation, so a smaller sanctuary was built in 1979. Together, the two connected buildings create a portrait of Jewish aspirations in the late-20th century."

In celebration of the 2018 Illinois Bicentennial, the North Shore Congregation Israel Synagogue was selected as one of the Illinois 200 Great Places  by the American Institute of Architects Illinois component (AIA Illinois).

References

External links
 Official website
 Architectural tour at Archive.org
 North Shore Congregation Israel Synagogue
Society of Architectural Historians SAH ARCHIPEDIA entry on North Shore Congregation Israel Synagogue

Synagogues in Glencoe, Illinois
Reform synagogues in Illinois
Jewish organizations established in 1920
1920 establishments in Illinois
1964 establishments in Illinois
Synagogues completed in 1964
Minoru Yamasaki buildings
Modernist architecture in Illinois